Can Cuiàs is the name of a station in the Barcelona Metro network, and currently the underground light-rail L11's western terminus (as of 2007), before a proposed extension into UAB and Ripollet is complete. As the other stations in the line, it was opened in 2003. It's named after a neighbourhood of Montcada i Reixac, a hilly municipality in the northern half of the metropolitan area of Barcelona. It has two accesses, one on Carrer Circumval·lació and another one on Carrer de Les Fustes.

See also
List of Barcelona Metro stations
Transport in Montcada i Reixac

External links
Can Cuiàs at Trenscat.com

Barcelona Metro line 11 stations
Railway stations in Spain opened in 2003
Transport in Montcada i Reixac